12k is an American independent record label, based in Pound Ridge, New York, United States. It was founded on January 1, 1997, by Taylor Deupree. The label focuses on experimental electronic music, specifically on digital minimalism and contemporary forms; as of 2021, it has released over 100 albums and become one of "the most consistent, and consistently excellent, record companies in the electronic music world." Notable artists appearing in the label's catalogue include Alva Noto and Frank Bretschneider (co-founder of the Raster-Noton label).

Current and former artists on 12k

Current and former artists on Line

Current and former artists on Happy
 Piana
 Gutevolk

See also
 List of record labels

References

External links
 Official site
 Discography
 Taylor Deupree / 12k examined

American independent record labels
Record labels established in 1997
Experimental music record labels
Electronic music record labels